Kasımpaşa may refer to:

Kasımpaşa, Beyoğlu, a quarter in Istanbul, Turkey
Kasımpaşa S.K., a Turkish football club